Indicates Void is the fifth studio album released by British musician, songwriter and producer Steven Wilson under the pseudonym Bass Communion, and was limited to 300 12-inch LP copies in handmade sleeves, 100 copies in a silver sleeve, 100 copies in a gold sleeve, and 100 copies as part of a box set of the first 3 "C" releases. The album was re-released on compact cassette in 2020 by Coup Sur Coup Records.

The album consists of Steven Wilson's 2005 recordings based primarily on one instrument source each, except for track 4 which was recorded with Theo Travis in 1998.

Track listing
All songs by Steven Wilson except track 4 by Steven Wilson and Theo Travis
 Guitar - 10:27
 Clarinet - 7:48
 Voice / Musical box - 10:49
 Piano / Soprano saxophone - 8:52

External links
Bass Communion Site at Steven Wilson Headquarters

2005 albums
Bass Communion albums
Coup Sur Coup Records albums